Janus Blythe (born January 29, 1951) is an American actress and scream queen known for her roles in horror films. She played major roles in films by Wes Craven, Tobe Hooper, and other major horror film directors during the latter half of the twentieth century.

A major role was that of Ruby, a feral girl in the middle of the Nevada desert, in the original 1977 film The Hills Have Eyes directed by Wes Craven. Craven wanted the actress playing the role to be fast, and Blythe won the role by racing other girls trying out for the role and beating them.

Filmography

References

External links

 

American film actresses
Living people
1951 births
21st-century American women